Cox's Bazar Government High School is a secondary boys' school in Cox's Bazar, the administrative headquarters of the district in Bangladesh of the same name. It was founded in 1874. It is located on the north-east side of Bir-Sreshtho Ruhul Amin Stadium. The area of the school is 23 acres. This is one of the oldest schools in the country.

The school
The school campus is urban, but has a well-maintained garden with trees of various kinds. There are five academic buildings. The library is associated with Bishwa Sahitya Kendra. It has a big auditorium named Shaheed Shah Alam - Bashir Milonayoton . The school has labs for physics, chemistry, agricultural science, computer science, and biology. These labs are equipped with necessary apparatus which are required to perform all the secondary school level experiment. It has a residence for headmaster, a canteen, a teacher's dormitory and a big play ground.

Structure
The school enrolls students from class (grade) 6 to 10. The school operates in two shifts - morning and day. In each shift generally exists two sections in each class (grade). And each section with 60 to 70 students. Every year about 300+ students appear in the SSC and JSC examination, with about two-thirds in science, and the rest in business studies.

Admissions
Every year an admission test is arranged between November–December session where authority select the students on the basis of merit position.

Uniform
The uniform of the school is a white shirt, white pant and white shoes. There is a badge on the shoulder which indicates morning or day shift student.

Co-curricular activities
 Boy Scouts
 Red Crescent

Notable alumni

 Khaled Mosharraf One of the great freedom fighters of Bangladesh, Sector Commander of 'Sector 2' during liberation war, salute as 'Bir Uttom' the best honor to a living freedom fighter.

Gallery

References

Further reading
 
 
 

High schools in Bangladesh
1874 establishments in India
Educational institutions established in 1874
Organisations based in Cox's Bazar